Adagege, alternatively spelled Ada Gege or Ada-gege, is an artificial island built on the reef in the Lau Lagoon on Malaita in the Solomon Islands; it is located in Malaita Province. The road from Auki ends at Fouia wharf opposite the islands of Sulufou and Adaege in the Lau Lagoon.

History
Originally settled by refugees from south of the Lau Lagoon, Adagage was taken over by the inhabitants of Sulufou and was converted into a specialised island for women to give birth at, later it was ritually cleansed and turned into a village. During the late 19th and early 20th century Adagege was the power base of Kwaisulia, a prominent strongman in the area who held influence across northern Malaita, during which time it was fortified with barbed wire.

References

Islands of the Solomon Islands